La Motte-Chalancon is a commune in the Drôme department in southeastern France.

Population

See also
Communes of the Drôme department
Patrice Jeener

References

Communes of Drôme